Riverfront Park is a 23-acre park located along the Willamette River in Salem, Oregon, in the United States. Features include the Riverfront Carousel (2001), A. C. Gilbert's Discovery Village, an amphitheatre, and Eco-Earth Globe, an outdoor sculpture and community art project completed in 2003. It is located on former industrial land owned by the Boise Cascade corporation redeveloped as part of the Riverfront-Downtown Urban Renewal Area.

See also
 List of contemporary amphitheatres
 Tom McCall Memorial (2008)
 Tourist sternwheelers of Oregon#Willamette Queen

References

External links
 
 Riverfront Park site map, City of Salem (PDF)
 Salem's Riverfront Park: One Park, Many Sights, Travel Salem (PDF)

Parks in Salem, Oregon